is a railway station in the town of Wakuya, Miyagi Prefecture, Japan, operated by East Japan Railway Company (JR East).

Lines
Wakuya Station is served by the Ishinomaki Line, and is located 6.2 rail kilometers from the terminus of the line at Kogota Station.

Station layout
The station has two opposed ground-level side platforms connected to the station building by a footbridge. The station is staffed.

Platforms

History
Wakuya Station opened on October 28, 1912. The station was absorbed into the JR East network upon the privatization of JNR on April 1, 1987. A new station building was completed in May 2013.

Passenger statistics
In fiscal year 2018, the station was used by an average of 559 passengers daily (boarding passengers only).

Surrounding area
Wakuya Town Hall
Wakuya Post Office

Shiroyama Castle Site

See also
 List of railway stations in Japan

References

External links

 

Railway stations in Miyagi Prefecture
Ishinomaki Line
Railway stations in Japan opened in 1912
Wakuya, Miyagi
Stations of East Japan Railway Company